The 1987 NCAA Division III men's basketball tournament was the 13th annual single-elimination tournament to determine the national champions of National Collegiate Athletic Association (NCAA) men's Division III collegiate basketball in the United States.

Held during March 1987, the field included thirty-two teams and the final championship rounds were contested at Calvin College in Grand Rapids, Michigan.

North Park defeated Clark (MA), 106–100, to claim their record-fifth NCAA Division III national title.

Bracket

Regional No. 1

Regional No. 2

Regional No. 3

Regional No. 4

Regional No. 5

Regional No. 6

Regional No. 7

Regional No. 8

National Quarterfinals

All tournament team
 Michael Starks, North Park 
 Mike Barach, North Park
 Steve Iannarino, Wittenberg
 Kermit Sharp, Clark (MA)
 Donald Ellison, Stockton State

See also
1987 NCAA Division I men's basketball tournament
1987 NCAA Division II men's basketball tournament
1987 NAIA men's basketball tournament
1987 NCAA Division III women's basketball tournament

References

NCAA Division III men's basketball tournament
NCAA Men's Division III Basketball
Ncaa Tournament
NCAA Division III basketball tournament